Vice Admiral Alan David Richards,  (born 1958) is a retired Royal Navy officer who served as Chief of Defence Intelligence from 2012 to 2015.

Naval career
Richards joined the Royal Navy in 1977. He became commanding officer of the frigate  and then of the frigate  in which he saw operational service during the Gulf War.

He went on to be Director of Force Development in 2002, Commander United Kingdom Carrier Strike Group in 2006, Assistant Chief of Defence Staff (International Security Policy) in 2007 and then Assistant Chief of Defence Staff (Resources and Plans) in 2009. He became Chief of Defence Intelligence in January 2012 on promotion to vice admiral. In the 2012 Queen's Birthday Honours, he was appointed a Companion of the Order of the Bath (CB).

Richards retired from the Royal Navy on 7 May 2015.

References

1958 births
Companions of the Order of the Bath
Deputy Lieutenants of Hertfordshire
Living people
Royal Navy vice admirals
Royal Navy personnel of the Gulf War